The Haydar Khana Mosque is a historic mosque in Baghdad, Iraq, built by Al-Nasir during the Abbasid Caliphate. The mosque is situated in Al Rasheed Street, the name of the mosque was attributed to Haydar Pasha Jalabi bin Muhammad Jalabi Shahbandar, who is buried in the same place along with some members of his family. The mosque was later reconstructed and expanded during 1819-1827 by the Wazir of Baghdad Dawud Pasha, the last wali of the Mamluk dynasty in Iraq. Dawud Pasha established the madrasa in the same place, known as Madrasa al-Dawudia. There is also an attached library. 

Reconstruction and maintenance were carried out in 1827 during the reign of the Ottoman Sultan Mahmud Khan bin Abdul-Hamid, again in 1890 by the Ottoman emir Abdul-Hamid Al-Thani. During this time, an attached water shop which faced the nearby Souq Haydar-Khana was demolished. During the 1920s, the mosque was utilized as an assembly place for revolutionaries who carried out numbers of revolutions throughout the decade. 

Haydar-Khana Mosque is considered one of the finest examples of the Ottoman constructions in Baghdad. The mosque is square-shaped, and the three doors are made of marble. Inside the mosque, there are mushollas (prayer space) for summer and winter, and the winter musholla is topped by the blue dome with two smaller domes and a minaret surrounding it.

Gallery

See also

 Iraqi art
 Islam in Iraq
 List of mosques in Iraq

References

19th-century mosques
Mosques in Baghdad
Ottoman mosques in Iraq
Shia mosques in Iraq
Sunni mosques in Iraq